Omar Mena Abreu (born August 13, 1966 in Havana, Ciudad de la Habana) is a retired male sprinter from Cuba. He claimed a total number of two medals at the 1995 Pan American Games in Mar del Plata, Argentina. Meña set his personal best in the men's 400 metres (46.19) on June 10, 1999 in Havana, Cuba.

Achievements

External links

1966 births
Living people
Cuban male sprinters
Athletes (track and field) at the 1996 Summer Olympics
Athletes (track and field) at the 1995 Pan American Games
Athletes (track and field) at the 1999 Pan American Games
Olympic athletes of Cuba
Athletes from Havana
Pan American Games medalists in athletics (track and field)
Pan American Games gold medalists for Cuba
Pan American Games bronze medalists for Cuba
Goodwill Games medalists in athletics
Central American and Caribbean Games gold medalists for Cuba
Competitors at the 1993 Central American and Caribbean Games
Central American and Caribbean Games medalists in athletics
Competitors at the 1994 Goodwill Games
Medalists at the 1995 Pan American Games
20th-century Cuban people